Paranoid Dream of the Zodiac is an album by the band Balzac. The CD combines two of Zodiac's (Balzac's side-project)  - "Beware on Halloween" and the maxi-single "Zodiac x Balzac".

Track listing
"Before the Nightmare"
"Brain Control"
"the Fright"
"Hurt"
"the 13th. on Friday Night"
"Killer in the Window"
"Dream of the Zodiac pt.1"
"Beware on Halloween"
"Paranoia"
"Dream of the Zodiac pt.2"
"Zodiac Killer pt.3"
"No Mercy"
"Unfinished"

Credits
 Hirosuke - vocals
 Atsushi - guitar
 Akio - bass guitar
 Takayuki - drums

External links
Official Balzac Japan site
Official Balzac USA site
Official Balzac Europe site

2007 albums
Balzac (band) albums